Dolní Kalná is a municipality and village in Trutnov District in the Hradec Králové Region of the Czech Republic. It has about 700 inhabitants.

Administrative parts
The village of Slemeno is an administrative part of Dolní Kalná.

References

Villages in Trutnov District